Peter or Pete Butler may refer to:

 Pete Butler (coach) (1909–1983), American football, basketball, and baseball coach and college athletics administrator
 Peter Butler (politician) (born 1951), Conservative Member of Parliament
 Peter Butler (rugby union) (born 1951), played rugby for Gloucester and England in the 1970s
 Peter Butler (golfer) (1932–2022), English golfer
 Peter Butler (footballer, born 1942), English Football League player
 Peter Butler (footballer, born 1966), English Football League player
 Peter Butler (surgeon) (born 1962), set to perform the first face transplant in the UK
 Peter Butler (runner) (born 1958), Canadian middle-distance runner
 Peter A. Butler, professor of physics at the University of Liverpool
 Peter Butler (trade unionist) (1901–1995), New Zealand seaman, trade unionist, communist and local politician